Julian West may refer to:
Julian West (author), author of Vita Brevis Ars Longa and winner of James White Award
Julian West, stage name for Nicolas de Gunzburg in the 1932 film Vampyr
Julian West, the main character of Edward Bellamy's novel Looking Backward